Kaunas Combined Heat and Power Plant is a natural gas-fired power plant in Kaunas, Lithuania.

References

Energy infrastructure completed in 1975
Cogeneration power stations in Lithuania
Natural gas-fired power stations in Lithuania
Buildings and structures in Kaunas
Power stations built in the Soviet Union